KCRG may refer to:

The Gazette (Cedar Rapids), a newspaper in Cedar Rapids, Iowa, United States, and the namesake and founding owner of the KCRG broadcasting stations in Cedar Rapids
KCRG-TV, a television station (Channel 9 digital/virtual) licensed to Cedar Rapids, Iowa, United States
KGYM, an AM radio station (1600 kHz) licensed to Cedar Rapids, Iowa, United States, which held the call sign KCRG until 2006
the ICAO code for Jacksonville Executive at Craig Airport in Jacksonville, Florida, United States